Jaco Visser is a South African former rugby league footballer who represented South Africa at the 1995 World Cup, playing in one match.

References

Living people
South African rugby league players
South Africa national rugby league team players
Place of birth missing (living people)
Date of birth missing (living people)
Year of birth missing (living people)